Herborg Kråkevik (born 28 December 1973) is a Norwegian singer and actress, known for her works with Norwegian folksongs and some stage works and many movies. Her more famous roles being her debut as Eliza in My Fair Lady (1997) and Julie in Romeo og Julie (1997).

Kråkevik gained much success when she in 2000 released Kråkeviks Songbok, a CD that included her interpretations of several Norwegian folk songs, including Den Fyrste Sang and a musical version of the poem Til Ungdommen by Norwegian poet and author Nordahl Grieg.

Kråkevik then had a leading role in Det største i verden (2001) as Petra.
In 2005, she was chosen one of Norway's ambassadors to the Hans Christian Andersen Association. Kråkevik is married and has two children.

Bibliography
2004: Forteljingar

Discography
1995: Mi Haugtussa
1998: Herborgs Verden (nominert til Spellemannprisen)
2000: Kråkeviks songbok
2002: Eg og Edith
2004: Forteljingar (lydbok)
2008: Annleis enn i går
2009: Kvar ein dag
2011: Alltid i mitt sinn
2012: Jul i stova

Filmography
1993: Det rare 
1996: Jakten på nyresteinen
2001: Det største i verden

Theatre
1995: Haugtussa - based on poems by Arne Garborg

at Den Nasjonale Scene in Bergen
1997: My Fair Lady (as Eliza Doolittle), 
1997: Romeo og Julie (as Julie)
2005: Funny Girl

References

External links
 Official website
 Herborg Kråkevik on Continental Music

1973 births
Living people
Norwegian film actresses
Norwegian Christians
Spellemannprisen winners
Norwegian television actresses
21st-century Norwegian singers
21st-century Norwegian women singers